The 2007 Russian Premier League was the 16th season of the Russian Football Championship, and the sixth under the current Russian Premier League name. The league was sponsored by insurance company Rosgosstrakh.

The season started on 10 March 2007 with the match between Luch-Energia and FC Moscow in Vladivostok, with the first goal of the season being scored by FC Moscow striker Héctor Bracamonte. It ended on 11 November 2007, when Zenit St. Petersburg claimed their first title with an away win over Saturn. Zenit became the second non-Moscow club to win the league, after Alania Vladikavkaz in 1995.

Spartak Moscow finished runners-up for the third consecutive season, while defending champions CSKA Moscow finished third.

Teams 
As in the previous season, 16 teams played in the 2007 season. After the 2006 season, Torpedo Moscow and Shinnik Yaroslavl were relegated to the 2007 Russian First Division. They were replaced by Khimki and Kuban Krasnodar, the winners and runners up of the 2006 Russian First Division.

Venues

Personnel and kits

Managerial changes

Tournament format and regulations 
Based on paragraph 15.3 of the Russian Premier League regulations for the current season, if two or more teams are equal on points (without having the highest number), the positions of these teams are determined by:
 higher number of wins in all matches;
 higher goal difference in all matches;
 results of matches between the teams in question (1. higher number of points obtained; 2. higher number of wins; 3. higher goal difference; 4. higher number of goals scored; 5. higher number of away goals scored);
 higher number of goals scored in all matches;
 higher number of away goals scored in all matches;
 drawing of lots.

Based on paragraph 15.4 of the regulations, if two teams are equal on the highest number of points, the first position is determined by:

 higher number of wins in all matches;
 results of matches between the two teams (1. higher number of points obtained; 2. higher goal difference; 3. higher number of goals scored; 4. higher number of away goals scored);
 drawing of lots, or an additional match between the two teams, with extra time and a penalty shoot-out if necessary.

Based on paragraph 15.5 of the regulations, if more than two teams are equal on the highest number of points, the first position and subsequent positions of these teams are determined by:

 higher number of wins in all matches;
 higher goal difference in all matches;
 results of matches between the teams in question (1. higher number of points obtained; 2. higher goal difference; 3. higher number of goals scored; 4. higher number of away goals scored);
 drawing of lots, or an additional tournament between the teams in question.1

1The terms of this additional tournament are determined by the Russian Football Union and the governing body of the Russian Premier League based on suggestions from the participating clubs.

League table

Results

Season statistics

Top goalscorers

Statistics 
 Goals: 562 (average 2.34 per match)
 From penalties: 57 (10%)
 Saved/Missed penalties: 17 (23%)
 Goals scored home: 348 (62%)
 Goals scored away: 214 (38%)
 Yellow cards: 1080 (average 4.50 per match)
 For violent conduct: 563 (52%)
 For unsporting behaviour: 425 (39%)
 For undisciplined behaviour: 8 (1%)
 Other: 84 (8%)
 Red cards: 49 (average 0.20 per match) For second yellow card: 27 (55%)
 For violent conduct: 9 (18%)
 For unsporting behaviour: 5 (9%)
 For undisciplined behaviour: 4 (8%)
 For denying an obvious goal-scoring opportunity: 4 (8%)
 Attendance: 3,147,567 (average 13,114 per match; 104,919 per matchday)'''

Awards 

On 30 November 2007 Russian Football Union named its list of 33 top players:

Goalkeepers
  Antonín Kinský (Saturn)
  Vladimir Gabulov (Kuban)
  Stipe Pletikosa (Spartak Moscow)

Right backs
  Branislav Ivanović (Lokomotiv Moscow)
  Aleksandr Anyukov (Zenit)
  Vasili Berezutskiy (CSKA Moscow)

Right-centre backs
  Sergei Ignashevich (CSKA Moscow)
  Denis Kolodin (Dynamo Moscow)
  Radoslav Kováč (Spartak Moscow)

Left-centre backs
  Ján Ďurica (Saturn)
  Martin Stranzl (Spartak Moscow)
  Nicolas Lombaerts (Zenit)

Left backs
  Aleksei Berezutskiy (CSKA Moscow)
  Kim Dong-Jin (Zenit)
  Emir Spahić (Lokomotiv Moscow)

Defensive midfielders
  Anatoliy Tymoschuk (Zenit)
  Dmitri Khokhlov (Dynamo Moscow)
  Aleksei Igonin (Saturn)

Right wingers
  Miloš Krasić (CSKA Moscow)
  Vladimir Bystrov (Spartak Moscow)
  Aleksei Ivanov (Luch-Energia and Saturn)

Central midfielders
  Konstantin Zyryanov (Zenit)
  Yegor Titov (Spartak Moscow)
  Igor Semshov (Dynamo Moscow)

Left wingers
  Yuri Zhirkov (CSKA Moscow)
  Diniyar Bilyaletdinov (Lokomotiv Moscow)
  Dmitri Torbinsky (Spartak Moscow)

Right forwards
  Vágner Love (CSKA Moscow)
  Roman Pavlyuchenko (Spartak Moscow)
  Danny (Dynamo Moscow)

Left forwards
  Andrei Arshavin (Zenit)
  Jô (CSKA Moscow)
  Dmitri Sychev (Lokomotiv Moscow)

Medal squads

See also 
 2007 in Russian football

References 

2007
1
Russia
Russia